Al Sadd Sports Club is a Qatari professional football club based in Doha. The club was formed in 1969 as Al Sadd Sports Club, and played their first competitive match in 1969, The club has won a total of 63 major trophies, At the local level the national championship a record 16 times also won the Emir of Qatar Cup a record 18 times, the Qatar Cup (ex) Crown Prince Cup a record 8 times, and the Sheikh Jassim Cup a record 15 times and outside the AFC Champions League two times and the Arab Champions League once. The club has also never been out of the top division of Qatari football since entering the Football League.

This is a list of the seasons played by Al Sadd SC from 1969 when the club first entered a league competition to the most recent seasons. The club's achievements in all major national and international competitions as well as the top scorers are listed. Top scorers in bold were also top scorers of Qatar Stars League. The list is separated into three parts, coinciding with the three major episodes of Qatari football:

History

Seasons 

Note 1: The first official Qatari Football League season was held in 1972–73.
Note 2: Competition was not held that year.

Honours

National

Asia

Regional

Notes

References 

Seasons
 
Al Sadd SC